Only What I Feel is the sixth studio album by American country music artist Patty Loveless and her first on the Epic Records label. It was released in 1993. Four tracks from the album made in into the Billboard top 20 country singles charts, including the #1 "Blame It on Your Heart" and the #3 "How Can I Help You Say Goodbye," later covered by Laura Branigan.  The #6 hit "You Will" was originally recorded by Anne Murray as the title track of her 1990 album.  The only single to not make the top ten was the #20 hit "Nothin' But The Wheel", considered by many Patty fans to be one of her finest works. The album peaked at #9, and was certified platinum for shipments of over 1,000,000 copies in the U.S. This album was Loveless' first album since she had surgery to repair burst nodes on her vocal cords in 1992.

Track listing

Content
The album produced four singles for Loveless, all of which reached top 20 on the U.S. country charts. Leading off the single releases was the Harlan Howard-Kostas co-write "Blame It on Your Heart," which in June 1993 became a Number One country hit. After it came "Nothin' but the Wheel," which peaked at #20 during the week of October 23, 1993. Peter Wolf covered the song on his record Sleepless. The album's third single was "You Will" at #6, followed by "How Can I Help You Say Goodbye" with a #3 peak in July 1994.

Personnel
Adapted from liner notes.

Drums: Owen Hale
Bass Guitar: Emory Gordy Jr.
Electric Guitar: Steve Gibson, Reggie Young
Acoustic Guitar: Biff Watson
Mandolin: Steve Gibson
Steel Guitar: Paul Franklin, Sonny Garrish
Fiddle: Stuart Duncan
Keyboards: Barry Beckett, John Barlow Jarvis, Mike Lawler, Gary Smith
Cello: John Catchings
Violins & Violas: David Angell, David Davidson, Jim Grosjean, Connie Heard, Kathryn Plummer, Christian Teal, Gary Van Osdale, Kris Wilkinson
String Arrangements: Emory Gordy Jr. (track 10)
Additional Musicians: Eddy Anderson, Mike Bowden, Pete Finney, Tim Hensley, Carmella Ramsey, Kenny Vaughan
Lead Vocals: Patty Loveless
Background Vocals: Kathy Burdick, Joe Diffie, Vince Gill, Tim Hensley, Kostas, Alison Krauss, Liana Manis, Donna McElroy, Carmella Ramsey, Curtis Young

Charts

Weekly charts

Year-end charts

References

1993 albums
Epic Records albums
Patty Loveless albums
Albums produced by Emory Gordy Jr.